Central Highlands, Australia may refer to:

Central Highlands (Victoria)
Central Highlands (Tasmania)

See also:
Central Highlands (disambiguation)